José Orlando Berríos (born May 27, 1994), nicknamed "La Makina" (Spanish for "The Machine"), is a Puerto Rican professional baseball pitcher for the Toronto Blue Jays of Major League Baseball (MLB). He previously played for the Minnesota Twins, who selected him in the first round of the 2012 Major League Baseball draft.

Professional career

Minor Leagues (2012–2016)
The Minnesota Twins selected Berríos in the first round of the 2012 Major League Baseball draft with the 32nd pick. He made his professional debut that season for the Gulf Coast Twins of the Rookie-level Gulf Coast League and was promoted to the Elizabethton Twins of the Rookie-level Appalachian League in August. In 30.2 innings pitched between both teams, he was 3–0 with a 1.17 ERA, striking out 49.

During the 2013 season, Berríos played for the Cedar Rapids Kernels of the Class A Midwest League where he was 7–7 with a 3.99 ERA in 19 starts. Berríos started 2014 with the Fort Myers Miracle of the Class A-Advanced Florida State League. He was selected to play in the All-Star Futures Game in July. After going 9–3 with a 1.96 ERA in 16 starts, he was promoted to the New Britain Rock Cats of the Class AA Eastern League on July 7. In eight starts for New Britain, he pitched to a 3–4 record and 3.54 ERA. He also played in one game for the Rochester Red Wings of the Class AAA International League at the end of the season. 

Berríos began the 2015 season with the Chattanooga Lookouts of the Class AA Southern League, and received another midseason promotion to Rochester. In 27 combined starts between the two clubs, he posted a 14–5 record and 2.87 ERA. He started the 2016 season with Rochester.

Minnesota Twins (2016–2021)

2016
The Twins promoted Berríos to make his major league debut on April 27, 2016. In 18 innings pitched for Rochester prior to his promotion, he was 2–0 with a 1.06 ERA and 20 strikeouts. He was recalled and optioned multiple times during the season. In 14 starts for Minnesota, he was 3–7 with an 8.02 ERA, and in 17 starts for Rochester, he was 10–5 with a 2.51 ERA.

2017
Berríos began 2017 with Rochester. After going 3–0 with a 1.13 ERA in six starts there, he was promoted to the Twins on May 13, where he spent the remainder of the season. In 26 games (25 starts) with Minnesota, he was 14–8 with a 3.89 ERA.

2018: All-Star season
Berríos began 2018 in Minnesota's starting rotation and made his first start of the 2018 season on April 1, 2018. He pitched a complete game three-hit shutout (the first of his career) against the Baltimore Orioles, with 6 strikeouts, leading the Twins to a 7–0 win. Berrios tied his career high 11 strikeouts on April 12, 2018, in a 4–0 win over the Chicago White Sox. On April 18, 2018, Berríos finished with five strikeouts and no walks in seven scoreless innings for Minnesota in a game played in his native Puerto Rico before a sold-out crowd at the Hiram Bithorn Stadium. Berrios became only the second Puerto Rican pitcher to start a regular-season MLB game at Hiram Bithorn; the first being Javier Vazquez, who made four starts there in 2003 with the Montreal Expos. His second career complete game came on June 7th against the Chicago White Sox, he became the 9th Twins pitcher to pitch a complete game and strikeout at least 10 batters without allowing a walk.

Owning an 8–7 record with a 3.54 ERA over 18 starts, Berríos was named to the 2018 MLB All-Star Game. He was the only Twin selected to participate in the all-star game. In the All-Star Game, Berríos pitched one scoreless 5th inning, earning a hold in the game. Berríos finished the season with 12–11 record with a 3.84 ERA and 202 strikeouts over 32 starts, leading the league in complete games and complete game shutouts.

2019
On March 5, 2019, it was reported that Berrios would start opening day against the Cleveland Indians. He went 7.2 innings and had 10 strikeouts while not allowing a run. He received the win and the Minnesota Twins won 2–0.

On July 3, 2019, it was announced that Berríos would participate in the 2019 MLB All-Star Game.

2020
With the 2020 Minnesota Twins, Berríos appeared in 12 games, compiling a 5–4 record with 4.00 ERA and 68 strikeouts in 63.0 innings pitched.

2021
With the 2021 Minnesota Twins, Berríos appeared 20 games, compiling a 7–5 with 3.48 ERA and 126 strikeouts in  innings pitched.

Toronto Blue Jays
On July 30, 2021, Berrios was traded to the Toronto Blue Jays in exchange for Austin Martin and Simeon Woods Richardson.

On November 16, 2021, Berríos agreed to a seven-year, $131 million extension with the Blue Jays. The deal was made official on November 18, 2021.

In 2022, he was 12–7 with a 5.23 ERA, as hitters batted .288 against him with an .804 OPS, the highest average and OPS in MLB against any qualified pitcher.

International career

World Baseball Classic

Berríos has played for the Puerto Rican national team twice, in the 2013 World Baseball Classic and in the 2017 World Baseball Classic, winning in both tournaments the silver medal. In October 2022, it was announced that Berrios intended to represent Puerto Rico in the World Baseball Classic for a third time in 2023.

Personal life 
Berríos is married to Jannieliz Márquez. They have two sons and one daughter. Berríos' wife Jannieliz is the sister of Irmarie Márquez, who is married to Javier Báez, an infielder for the Detroit Tigers.

Philanthropy
During the offseason, Berríos went to his hometown of Bayamón and delivered water, food, and other supplies to people in need as a consequence of Hurricane Maria which caused massive damage to Puerto Rico in September 2017.

See also
 List of Major League Baseball players from Puerto Rico

References

External links 

1994 births
Living people
American League All-Stars
Sportspeople from Bayamón, Puerto Rico
Major League Baseball players from Puerto Rico
Major League Baseball pitchers
Minnesota Twins players
Toronto Blue Jays players
Gulf Coast Twins players
Elizabethton Twins players
Cedar Rapids Kernels players
Fort Myers Miracle players
New Britain Rock Cats players
Rochester Red Wings players
Chattanooga Lookouts players
2013 World Baseball Classic players
2017 World Baseball Classic players
2023 World Baseball Classic players